For Love Alone is a 1986 Australian film directed by Stephen Wallace and starring Helen Buday, Hugo Weaving and Sam Neill.  The screenplay was written by Wallace, based on the 1945 novel of the same name by Christina Stead.  The film marked the screen debut of Naomi Watts. The film was entered into the 37th Berlin International Film Festival.

Plot
In the 1930s, Teresa (Buday) is a naive young woman dealing with the oppressive attitudes of society and her father's austere ways.  She has a fling with university Latin professor Jonathan Crow (Weaving). It takes her some time to realize that he does not desire a serious relationship. Teresa then starts dating liberal-minded banker James Quick (Neill). Once she's settled down with Quick, the idealistic Teresa becomes enamored with another intellectual, poet Harry (Williams). Quick encourages the affair, hoping that Teresa will come to realize that there's more to true love than mere sexual impulsivity.

Principal cast

Production
The film was a pet project for producer Margaret Fink who took six years to raise finance. The bulk of the money came from a pre-sale to Greater Union and from UA. Fink had been impressed by Stir and asked Stephen Wallace to direct.

Fay Weldon wrote some early drafts but neither Fink or Wallace were happy with them so Wallace did the adaptation himself. Wallace says it took him three and a half years to write the script.

Peter Strauss was originally cast to play James Quick but was replaced by Sam Neill. Geneviève Picot was tentatively cast in the lead role but it took two years to raise the money by which time it was felt she was too old so she was replaced by Helen Buday, who had only made one film previously.

Most of the movie was shot in Sydney starting in March 1985 with a four-day shoot at Oxford University.

Reception
The movie received poor reviews. Stephen Wallace says he was particularly shocked by the reviews from feminists and women's magazines. "They attacked it so viciously. So I guess it wasn't a totally competent film. I know it was a bit slow and clumsy and I have to accept that."

For Love Alone grossed $193,000 at the box office in Australia which was considered a disappointment. Stephen Wallace regrets his treatment of the subject matter was not bolder.

See also
Cinema of Australia

References

External links

For Love Alone at Oz Movies

1986 films
1986 drama films
Australian drama films
Films based on Australian novels
Films set in the 1930s
Films shot in Sydney
Films directed by Stephen Wallace
1980s English-language films